A fanfare (or fanfarade or flourish) is a short musical flourish which is typically played by trumpets (including fanfare trumpets), French horns or other brass instruments, often accompanied by percussion. It is a "brief improvised introduction to an instrumental performance". A fanfare has also been defined in The Golden Encyclopedia of Music as "a musical announcement played on brass instruments before the arrival of an important person", such as heralding the entrance of a monarch (the term honors music for such announcements does not have the specific connotations of instrument or style that fanfare does). Historically, fanfares were usually played by trumpet players, as the trumpet was associated with royalty. Bugles are also mentioned. The melody notes of a fanfare are often based around the major triad, often using "[h]eroic dotted rhythms".

By extension, the term may also designate a short, prominent passage for brass instruments in an orchestral composition. Fanfares are widely used in opera orchestral parts, notably in Richard Wagner's  and Lohengrin and in Beethoven's Fidelio. In Fidelio, the dramatic use of the fanfare is heightened by having the trumpet player perform offstage, which creates a muted effect.

Etymology
The word has been traced to a 15th-century Spanish root,  ("vaunting"). Though the word may be onomatopoeic, it is also possible that it is derived from the Arabic word  ("trumpets"). The word is first found in 1546 in French, and in English in 1605, but it was not until the 19th century that it acquired its present meaning of a brief ceremonial flourish for brass. Indeed, an alternative term for the fanfare is "flourish", as in the"ruffles and flourishes played by military bands in the US to announce the arrival of the president, a general, or other high-ranking dignitary. "In the England of Shakespeare's time", fanfares "were often known as flourishes and sometimes as 'tuckets' " (a word related to toccata).

History
In French usage,  also may refer to a hunting signal (given either on "starting" a stag, or after the kill when the hounds are given their share of the animal). In both France and Italy, fanfare was the name given in the 19th century to a military or civilian brass band. In French, this usage continues to the present, and distinguishes the all-brass band from bands of mixed brass and woodwind, which is called Harmonie. Fanfares have been imitated in art music as early as the 14th century. Examples in opera include a fanfare for the governor's arrival in Beethoven's Fidelio, act 2. In the 20th century, well-known composed fanfares include Aaron Copland's Fanfare for the Common Man (1942), for brass and percussion, and Igor Stravinsky's Fanfare for a New Theatre (1964), for two trumpets.

Copland's Fanfare is one of a series of 18 commissioned by Cincinnati Symphony Orchestra conductor Eugene Goossens in 1942–43, each to open a concert. Each was to salute an aspect of the war effort; the U.S. had entered World War II the previous year. The only one of these fanfares to become well known is Copland's; the others are rarely if ever performed or recorded. The set, with the date of the concert at which each was performed, is:

1. A Fanfare for Airmen, Bernard Wagenaar, Oct. 9, 1942
2. A Fanfare for Russia, Deems Taylor, Oct. 16, 1942.
3. A Fanfare for the Fighting French, Walter Piston, Oct. 23, 1942.
4. A Fanfare to the Forces of our Latin-American Allies, Henry Cowell, Oct. 30, 1942. (Recorded.)
5. A Fanfare for Friends, Daniel Gregory Mason, Nov. 6, 1942.
6. A Fanfare for Paratroopers, Paul Creston, Nov. 27, 1942.
7. Fanfare de la Liberté, Darius Milhaud, Dec. 11, 1942.
8. A Fanfare for American Heroes, William Grant Still, Dec. 18, 1942.
9. Fanfare for France, Virgil Thomson, Jan. 15, 1943.
10. Fanfare for Freedom, Morton Gould, Jan. 22, 1943. (Recorded.)
11. Fanfare for Airmen, Leo Sowerby, Jan. 29, 1943. (Recorded.)
12. Fanfare for Poland, Harl McDonald, Feb. 5, 1943.
13. Fanfare for the Medical Corps, Anis Fuleihan, Feb. 26, 1943.
14. Fanfare for the American Soldier, Felix Borowski, March 5, 1943.
15. Fanfare for the Common Man, Aaron Copland, March 12, 1943. (Many recordings. Incorporated into Copland's Symphony No. 3.)
16. Fanfare for the Signal Corps, Howard Hanson, April 2, 1943.
17. Fanfare for the Merchant Marine, Eugene Goossens, April 16, 1943.
18. Fanfare for Commandos, Bernard Rogers, Feb. 20, 1943.

Sources

Works cited
 
 
 
 
 
 
 
 

Musical terminology
Hunting